The Legislature of Corrientes Province is the legislature of Salta, one of the twenty three provinces that make up Argentina. It is a bicameral body, comprising the Chamber of Deputies (made up of 30 representatives), and the Senate (with 15 representatives).

It is one of eight bicameral legislatures in the country. Members of both houses are elected by proportional representation in a single province-wide district. Senators serve for six years and deputies serve for four years; elections to both chambers are staggered; the Senate renews a third of its members every two years while the Chamber of Deputies renews half of its members every two years, emulating the system employed by both houses of the National Congress.

Both houses of the Legislature convene in the provincial capital of Corrientes.

See also

 List of provincial legislatures in Argentina
 Parliament of Argentina

Notes

References

Bicameral legislatures
Government of Argentina
Corrientes Province
Corrientes